1-Phosphatidylinositol-4,5-bisphosphate phospholipase beta-1 is an enzyme that in humans is encoded by the PLCB1 gene.

Function 

The protein encoded by this gene catalyzes the formation of inositol 1,4,5-trisphosphate and diacylglycerol from phosphatidylinositol 4,5-bisphosphate. This reaction uses calcium as a cofactor and plays an important role in the intracellular transduction of many extracellular signals. This gene is activated by two G-protein alpha subunits, alpha-q and alpha-11. Two transcript variants encoding different isoforms have been found for this gene.

Interactions 

PLCB1 has been shown to interact with TRPM7.

Pathology 

Homozygous PLCB1 deletion is associated with malignant migrating partial seizures in infancy.

References

Further reading 

 
 
 
 
 
 
 
 
 
 
 
 
 
 
 
 
 
 

EC 3.1.4